Fudge is a type of confectionery, usually made with sugar, milk, butter and flavoring, and often chocolate.

Fudge may also refer to:

People
Fudge as a surname may refer to:
 Alan Fudge (born 1944), American actor
 Ann M. Fudge (born 1951) former CEO of Young & Rubicam, serves on a number of corporate boards
 Edward Fudge (1944-2017), American theologian
 Georgia Fudge, American female bodybuilder
 Jamaal Fudge (born 1983), American footballer
 Marcia Fudge (born 1952), American politician
 Paula Fudge (born 1952), English long-distance runner

Fictional characters
 Farley Drexel "Fudge" Hatcher, character in the Fudge series of books by Judy Blume
 Cornelius Fudge, Minister for Magic in the Harry Potter books by J. K. Rowling
 Fatty Fudge, cartoon character in The Beano comic

Entertainment
 Fudge, a book series by Judy Blume
 Fudge (TV series), an American television series based on the book series
 Fudge (role-playing game system)
 The Fudge, a Dutch rock band
 Fudge 44, 2006 feature film by Graham Jones

Other uses
 Fudge (chocolate bar), a brand of chocolate bar made by Cadbury
 Fudge duck, colloquial name for the Ferruginous Duck 
 A minced oath of fuck